Oronhyatekha (10 August 1841 – 3 March 1907), ("Burning Sky" or "Burning Cloud" in the Mohawk language, also carried the baptismal name Peter Martin), was a Mohawk physician, scholar, and a unique figure in the history of British colonialism. He was the first known aboriginal scholar at Oxford University; a successful CEO of a multinational financial institution; a native statesman; an athlete of international standing; and an outspoken champion of the rights of women, children, and minorities. He was once thought to be the first Native M.D. in Canada, having gotten his degree in 1866 from Toronto School of Medicine, but Peter Edmund Jones (Ojibwa), from New Credit, has been documented as having graduated a few months before Oronhyatekha. The fact that Oronhyatekha achieved these results during the Victorian era, when racism and pressure for First Nations peoples to assimilate were commonplace, has made him a figure approaching legend in some aboriginal circles.

Biography
Born 10 August 1841 on the Six Nations of the Grand River near Brantford, Ontario, he was the sixth son of Peter Martin and Lydia Loft (from Tyendinaga), and one of up to eighteen children. He first attended the Mohawk Institute residential school, where he was taught the shoemaker trade. He attended the Wilbraham Wesleyan Academy in Wilbraham, Massachusetts. After graduating, he taught for a year among the Indians and then entered Kenyon College in Ohio for three years.

Oronhyatekha was selected at the age of twenty by the Six Nations Iroquois Confederacy (consisting of the Mohawk, Oneida, Onondaga, Cayuga, Seneca, and Tuscarora Nations) to give the welcoming address to the Prince of Wales during his visit to Canada and the US. Legend has it that Prince Edward was sufficiently impressed that he urged the young Oronhyatekha to attend the University of Oxford, which he had attended. Correspondence between Oronhyatekha and the Prince's physician, Henry Acland, suggests that this was really Acland's idea. Acland taught at Oxford and became Oronhyatekha's mentor and friend for the rest of their lives. Oronhyatekha matriculated at St Edmund Hall, Oxford in May 1862, and was befriended by Outram Marshall, who took him under his wing. However, he returned to the Six Nations Reserve shortly afterwards, in June of that year, to clear his name of charges made by missionary Abraham Nelles, who worked there.

After returning to Canada, Martin married Ellen Hill, or Karakwineh (meaning "moving sun"). He also enrolled in the Toronto School of Medicine in 1863. He graduated with his B.M. in 1865 and his M.D. in 1866. In 1866, he also served in the Queen's Own Rifles during the Battle of Ridgeway, one of the armed conflicts of the Fenian Raids from the US of that year.

After graduation, he practiced at Frankford, Stratford, Napanee, Buffalo, New York, and London, Ontario. As his medical practice grew, he also became a figure of increasing importance in Victorian Canada. In 1871, he became a member of the Canadian National Rifle Team which competed at Wimbledon. In 1874, he was elected the President of the Grand Council of Indian Chiefs, a provincial organization largely made up of Anishinabe and Iroquoian communities in southwestern Ontario.

In 1878, while living in London, Oronhyatekha applied to become a member of the Independent Order of Foresters, a fraternal and financial institution. The Foresters' statutes explicitly limited its membership to white men and Orangemen, but Oronhyatekha was an Orangeman. By 1881 he had become Supreme Chief Ranger of Foresters, the organisation's international CEO, a position that he held for a record 26 years. In 1889, he moved to Toronto, where the IOF headquarters had relocated. During his tenure as SCR, Oronhyatekha transformed the order into one of the wealthiest fraternal financial institutions in the Victorian world; today, it counts more than one-million members in North America and the European Union. Oronhyatekha was an active Orangeman and served as County Grand Master of Middlesex Country Orange Lodge.

While heading the Foresters, he built one of the first North American museums created by a Native individual. It was housed in the Foresters' Temple, which once stood at the corner of Bay and Richmond in Toronto, until shortly after his death. It contained natural history artifacts, items from Canadian Native groups, and from cultures around the world. The artifacts were transferred to the Royal Ontario Museum in 1911. For its time, the Temple was the tallest office building in the British empire and incorporated the latest technology, such as electric elevators and lights, both of which were powered by an electrical plant in the basement; a chilled drinking water system; and extensive fireproofing. The Temple also featured many amenities for its staff, including its own newsstand, cafe and dining room, smoking room, meeting rooms, and bicycle storage.

Oronhyatekha also belonged to the International Order of Good Templars, several branches of the Masonic Order, the Ancient Order of United Workmen, the Knights of the Maccabees, and the Orange Order. He was the Worshipful Master of Richardson Masonic Lodge in Stouffville, Ontario in 1894.

In the 1890s, he purchased an island from his wife's family across from Deseronto, which he renamed as Foresters' Island. Here, he built a second family home, an IOF meeting and dining hall, a bandstand, the Isle Hotel and cottages for guests, and a wharf at which boats from the mainland could dock. While the hotel seems to have been open for all guests, not just IOF members, Martin hosted huge IOF gatherings each summer to celebrate its anniversaries.

 Oronhyatekha was most proud of an orphanage he established in 1904 on the Bay of Quinte, Ontario. It opened for operations in 1906, and Oronhyatekha described it as his life's crowning achievement. But he died the next year, and the orphanage was sold in 1908.

He and Ellen had six children together, only two of whom survived to adulthood. Three of his children died very early. One son, Henry, drowned at the age of 10 during the sinking of the Victoria on the Thames River in London, Ontario, on Victoria Day of 1881. His eldest child, Catherine, married Percy John Johnson, an Australian. His son Acland Martin, who also became a medical doctor, married twice. Neither had any children. Acland died young, a few months after his father.

Legacy and honors
Oronhyatekha has been commemorated in several ways: 
A plaque was erected by the Toronto Historical Board in Allan Gardens in Cabbagetown, where he had lived in Toronto. His house at 209 Carlton is listed in the Cabbagetown heritage inventory and is part of the Cabbagetown Heritage District. A nearby lane has been named Dr. O Lane. 
His former home in London, Ontario, at 172 Central (formerly Litchfield) Avenue, is under consideration for local designation. The Temple building, which would have easily qualified for historic status, was demolished in the 1970s. 
 A sculpture of Oronhyatekha by Walter Seymour Allward was moved to the IOF new headquarters at 789 Don Mills Road. 
Parks Canada designated Oronhyatekha as a national historic person in 2001, erecting a plaque at Tyendinaga. 
In 2002, the Royal Ontario Museum and the Woodland Cultural Centre curated an exhibit called Mohawk Ideals, Victorian Values: Oronhyatekha M.D.. It featured his museum collection, once displayed at the IOF Temple building. 
His biography was co-authored by Keith Jamieson and Michelle Hamilton for Dundurn Press. 
A collection of photos of Oronhyatekha has been started on Facebook.

References

External links
 
 
 Dr. Oronhyatekha: Security, Justice, and Equality, Jamieson, Keith and Michelle A. Hamilton. Dundurn Press, 2014
 Foresters. Historical Mosaic. 

1841 births
1907 deaths
19th-century Canadian physicians
Alumni of St Edmund Hall, Oxford
University of Toronto alumni
Indigenous leaders in Ontario
Canadian Mohawk people
Persons of National Historic Significance (Canada)
Six Nations of the Grand River
First Nations academics